Vinod Kambli (born 18 January 1972) is an Indian former international cricketer, who played for India as a left-handed middle order batsman, as well as for Mumbai and Boland, South Africa. Kambli became the first cricketer to score a century in a One-day International on his birthday.

He has the highest career batting average for an Indian test cricketer of 54 but he played his last test when he was just 23 years old. Thereafter, he was only considered to play for One Day International matches, although his last appearance in that format was also at the young age of 28.

He has appeared as a commentator on various television channels and worked with a Marathi News channel as a cricket expert for the 2019 Cricket World Cup. He has also been a part of various reality shows and done a few serials and Bollywood films as an actor. He played a supporting role in the Kannada film Bettanagere. Kambli is currently on the Cricket Improvement Committee for Mumbai Cricket Association and had reportedly pleaded to MCA for work, due to the need to look after his family.

Early life
Vinod Kambli hails from Indira Nagar, Kanjur Marg (Mumbai). He is a childhood friend of the Indian cricketer Sachin Tendulkar.

School cricket and later
He shared an unbroken partnership of 664 runs with Sachin Tendulkar in a school cricket match against St. Xavier's School, Fort. Kambli contributed 349 runs before their coach Acharekar forced the pair to declare the innings; he then took six wickets for 37 runs in St. Xavier's first innings.

Kambli started his Ranji Trophy career with a six off the first ball he faced. He made his One Day International and Test debuts in 1991 and 1992, respectively. In Tests, he made four centuries including two double-centuries. He also holds the record for the Indian player  to fastest (14 innings) reach 1000 runs in Tests.

International career
He scored 224 against England at Wankhede Stadium in 1993 as his
maiden test century in his third test. In the next test against
Zimbabwe, he scored 227. In his next test series, he scored 125 and 120
against Sri Lanka. He is also the only cricketer to hit three
consecutive test centuries in three innings, all centuries against
different countries. In his 17 Tests,  he averaged 69.13 in the first
innings, and just 9.40 in the second innings, with a difference of
59.73.

He made his ODI debut in 1991 against Pakistan during the Wills
Sharjah Trophy. He played world cup tournaments in 1992 and 1996. He has
2 ODI centuries into his credit: 100 not out against England at Jaipur
in 1993 on his birthday, setting the record for becoming the first batsman to score an ODI hundred on his birthday and 106 against Zimbabwe at Kanpur in the 1996 World Cup.

He played his last Test match at the age of only 24[11]
while he played his last ODI in the year 2000 and formally announced
his retirement from first-class cricket on 22 September 2011.[12]

He played for Boland province in the South African domestic circuit.

Coaching
On 15 August 2009, Kambli launched his Khel Bharti Sports Academy  in Mumbai and announced his retirement from cricket as he wished to coach at Khel Bharti Academy.

He has been the Head Coach for the MCA Academy in BKC, Mumbai. 

Vinod Kambli fulfilled a position within Tendulkar Middlesex Global Academy between 2018 and 2022. He finished his full time role as TMGA Head Coach for the Academy at DY Patil, Navi Mumbai in early 2022.

Personal life
Vinod Kambli first married Noella Lewis, a Catholic at St. Patrick's Cathedral, Poona. She worked as a receptionist at Hotel Blue Diamond (in Pune) in the year 1998.
After separating from her Kambli married fashion model Andrea Hewitt. The couple has a child born in June 2010.

After his marriage to his second wife Andrea, Kambli converted to the Catholic Church, naming his son Jesus Christiano Kambli. Despite his conversion Kambli stated that he still respects all religions.

Journalist Kunal Purandare has penned his biography called Vinod Kambli: The Lost Hero.

Health

On Friday, 29 November 2013, Kambli was admitted to Mumbai's Lilavati Hospital, following a heart attack.  Kambli was taken ill while he was driving from Chembur to Bandra and suddenly stopped the car. A policewoman on duty, Sujata Patil noticed he could not drive and arranged to rush him to Lilavati Hospital. Kambli had undergone angioplasty on two of his blocked arteries in 2012.

Politics
Vinod Kambli joined the Bhakti Shakti Party and was appointed vice-president of the party. He contested the 2009 Assembly election from Vikhroli, Mumbai as a Lok Bharati Party candidate and lost the election. However, he continues to do social work. In 2011, he supported Anna Hazare's campaign of India against Corruption.

Film career

Vinod Kambli has appeared in films:

Television
Vinod Kambli made his debut on the small screen on DD National in a serial called Miss India in 2002. He also was a contestant on Bigg Boss.

References

External links

1972 births
Living people
India One Day International cricketers
India Test cricketers
Indian cricketers
Cricketers at the 1996 Cricket World Cup
Indian Christians
Converts to Christianity
West Zone cricketers
Mumbai cricketers
Boland cricketers
Contestants on Indian game shows
Indian cricket commentators
Cricketers who have acted in films
Bigg Boss (Hindi TV series) contestants